is an editorial category of Japanese comics targeting an audience of adolescent boys. It is, along with  manga (targeting adolescent girls and young women),  manga (targeting young adult and adult men), and  manga (targeting adult women), one of the primary editorial categories of manga.  manga is traditionally published in dedicated manga magazines that exclusively target the  demographic group. 

Of the four primary demographic categories of manga,  is the most popular category in the Japanese market. While  manga ostensibly targets an audience of young males, its actual readership extends significantly beyond this target group to include all ages and genders. The category originated from Japanese children's magazines at the turn of the 20th century and gained significant popularity by the 1920s. The editorial focus of  manga is primarily on action, adventure, and the fighting of monsters or other forces of evil. Though action narratives dominate the category, there is deep editorial diversity and a significant number of genres and subgenres within  manga, especially when compared to other comic cultures outside of Japan, including comedy, crime, romance, slice of life, and sports.

Terminology and etymology

The Japanese word  (少年 /ɕoːnen/) translates literally to "few years".  historically referred to juveniles in a general sense, and was used by the Japanese publishing industry to designate publications aimed at children and young people until the end of the 19th century. The word shifted to its current usage of referring specifically to media aimed at adolescent boys beginning with the practice of segmenting periodicals (especially manga magazines) by sex and age-specific target groups, which was established at the beginning of the 20th century and accelerated starting in the 1960s. This system of segmentation is now openly used as a categorization system by manga publishers and extends into works that are adapted from manga, such as anime.

manga
 manga refers to manga aimed at an audience of adolescent boys, with the primary target audience alternately defined as 9 to 18 years old and as 12 to 18 years old. Of the four primary demographic categories of manga (and ), it is the most popular category in the Japanese market. 

The actual readership of  manga, as is the case for all demographic categories of manga, extends significantly beyond this adolescent male target group to include all ages and genders. For example, a 2006 survey of female manga readers found that Weekly Shōnen Jump was the most popular manga magazine among this demographic, placing ahead of magazines that specifically target a female readership. The target group orientation of  manga is particularly evident in the non-manga content of  manga magazines, which include advertising and articles on topics tailored to the interests of young males, such as video games. Non-manga content often corresponds to a major manga series in a given magazine, for example, advertisements for a video game adaptation of the series, or articles about an animated film adaptation of the series.

History

Pre-war and wartime era

Children's magazines with sex-segregated readerships have existed in Japan since the early 1900s. While early youth magazines were ostensibly unisex – Shōnen Sekai was the first youth magazine in Japan in 1895, targeting a readership of both boys and girls – in practice, the editorial content of these publications largely concerned topics that were thought to be of interest to boys. This provoked the emergence of first exclusively  (girls) magazines in 1902, and  magazines subsequently began to exclusively target a male audience. Initially, these magazines did not publish manga; the first  magazine to do so was Shōnen Pakku, first published in 1907. This was followed by Shōnen Club in 1914 and later Yōnen Club. Among the most successful and influential manga series in these early  magazines were Norakuro by Suihō Tagawa, which follows the life of an anthropomorphic dog soldier, and Tank Tankuro by Gajo Sakamoto, about a robot-like character who can change his appearance.

 magazine enjoyed significant popularity during the 1920s and 1930s, with Yōnen Club selling over 950,000 copies. During the Second Sino-Japanese War and Second World War, magazine sales declined and publications were used increasingly for wartime propaganda purposes. The manga content in these publications was reduced, and the series that remained typically focused on patriotic and militaristic themes, such as stories about samurai. In other stories, robots were depicted as fighting in the war against the Allied forces, as analogous to western superhero comics that depicted superheroes fighting the Axis powers during this same period.

Post-war era
During the post-war occupation of Japan, the Japanese publishing industry was rebuilt under initially strict guidelines. Stories focused on war, combat, and most competitive sports were banned with the aim of discouraging belligerence and hindering the use of manga for pro-Imperial propaganda. Manga developed during this period under the influence of artist Osamu Tezuka, with series such as Astro Boy and Kimba the White Lion. Tezuka was inspired by American cartoons, and pioneered the so-called "story manga": long-running manga series with a cinematic style and continuity across multiple chapters, contrasting what had previously been a medium defined by one-off comic strips. Science fiction stories about robots, space travel, and heroic space-faring adventures enjoyed popularity during this period; many sci-fi stories took themes and concepts from war comics and re-imagined them with pacifist ideals, such as Tetsujin 28-go by Mitsuteru Yokoyama. 

One of the first new  manga magazines of the post-war period was Manga Shōnen, which launched in 1947 and published works by Tezuka, Leiji Matsumoto, and Shōtarō Ishinomori. The first works of sports manga also emerged from  manga during this time; notable early works include  by Eiichi Fukui as the first manga series in the genre, and Ashita no Joe by Asao Takamori and Tetsuya Chiba, which became one of the most commercially successful works in the genre. 1959 saw the launch of Shōnen Sunday and Weekly Shōnen Magazine, the first weekly  manga magazines. Other weeklies, such as Shōnen Champion, Shōnen King, and Shōnen Ace, emerged in the 1960s. Weekly Shōnen Jump was first published in 1968, and would establish itself as the best-selling manga magazine across demographic categories, a position it holds to this day. Many of the most popular and commercially successful  series originated in Weekly Shōnen Jump, including Dragon Ball by Akira Toriyama, Naruto by Masashi Kishimoto, Bleach by Tite Kubo, One Piece by Eiichiro Oda, and Slam Dunk by Takehiko Inoue.

Modern era
 manga became formalized as a category of manga aimed at an older male audience in the late 1960s and early 1970s, and many  artists associated with the realist  movement migrated to  manga. As a result,  manga came to deal with more serious and political themes, and saw an increase in depictions of violent and explicit subjects, as well as an increase in profanity. Significant artists of this era include Shigeru Mizuki, creator of the horror series GeGeGe no Kitarō; and George Akiyama, whose  manga series Ashura depicts cannibalism, child abuse, and mass murder. Manga artist Go Nagai originated the sexually-charged  genre with Harenchi Gakuen, which was serialized in Weekly Shōnen Jump.
 
For example, the characteristic large eyes of  manga became common in  manga to convey the emotions of characters, and female characters have enjoyed greater prominence as both supporting and primary characters in  manga. Other graphic storytelling techniques that originated in  manga, such as montages of multiple panels, were imported into  manga and have become common stylistic devices. Female manga artists also began to enjoy increasing critical and commercial success as  manga creators. When manga began to emerge in the western world in the early 1990s, the  category was so dominant in these new markets that it came to shape the image of manga as a whole. While  made gains in popularity by the 2000s,  remains the most popular category of manga, both in Japan and internationally.

Characteristics

Themes and genres
This thematic orientation of  manga is readily inferred from the formal values or slogans that  manga magazines assign themselves: for example, "friendship, perseverance, and victory" for Weekly Shōnen Jump, and "courage, friendship and fighting spirit" for CoroCoro Comic. The editorial focus of  manga is primarily on action, adventure, and the fighting of monsters or other forces of evil. Action stories are so dominant in  manga that some manga and non-manga works are occasionally designated as  not because of their ostensible target group, but because of their content focus on action and adventure. Though action narratives dominate the category, there is deep editorial diversity and a significant number of genres and subgenres within  manga, especially when compared to other comic cultures outside of Japan. This includes but is not limited to comedy, crime, romance, slice of life, and stories about activities such as sports and the lives of different types of working professionals. 

The action genre is itself is expressed through a variety of subgenres, from historical and contemporary drama to science fiction and fantasy.  war fiction has been alternately jingoistic or critical of militarism and violence, with Barefoot Gen by Keiji Nakazawa as a notable example of the latter. Samurai appeared frequently as idealized role models for boy readers in early , analogous to representations of cowboys in western comics; samurai stories shifted to comedy and sportsmanship in the post-war period, before returning to themes of idealized themes of good versus evil. Though  manga typically attempts to convey a message of peace, the category has been criticized by individuals such as director Hayao Miyazaki for promoting overly simple good/evil dichotomies.

Narrative conventions
A  protagonist is often characterized by contradictory qualities: short-tempered and cool, mischievous and rebellious, serious and cynical, clumsy and infallible, or who appears as a good-for-nothing but possesses hidden abilities. Transformation abilities are often linked with bonds to a spirit, monster or robot. A major narrative device in  manga is rivalry between the protagonist and his opponent, with a fight or a quest often appearing as a central element; Dragon Ball is among the most popular and commercially successful examples of this archetypal story. 

Typically, a  protagonist is an outsider, or in some way disadvantaged compared to others, but who through training, perseverance, and willpower eventually succeeds against all odds. Plots typically follow the basic structure of the hero's journey, with much of the story focused on the protagonist's training and transformation into a hero, and on characters who earn their status as heroes through effort and tenacity rather than by virtue of birth or assignment. For long-running series, the hero's journey repeats itself; as a new story arc begins, the enemy becomes more powerful and the danger to be overcome becomes greater. In addition to these external conflicts, a  protagonist often also faces internal conflicts, typically focused around maturity and growing older. In contrast to  manga, which often focuses on the thoughts and interior monologue of the hero,  typically advances plot through dialogue and action. Happy endings are common in  manga, but are not obligatory, with writers expressing the happy ending fitting for the demography even if it not comes up as a suitable.

Visual style

Visually, a  protagonist often possesses what manga critic Jason Thompson describes as "insanely spiky hair" that distinguishes the protagonist's silhouette from that of other characters. The eyes of  characters in the post-war period are significantly smaller than those of characters in  manga; large eyes are used in  manga to better convey the emotions of the characters, an aspect which has historically been given less focus in  manga. A common visual device in  action scenes is to depict the contours of figures with rough, coarse motion lines to give the appearance of movement.

Role of women
Historically, the protagonists of  manga were almost exclusively men and boys; women and girls appeared primarily in supporting roles as sisters, mothers, or girlfriends, if at all. This was especially true of  stories that developed out of  manga beginning in the 1970s, with The Abashiri Family by Go Nagai as one of the earliest representative works of this development, as well as an early example of a  manga with a female protagonist. Since the 1980s, women and girls have played a more active role in  manga, fighting alongside male characters and not merely as passive support. Dr. Slump by Akira Toriyama was an early representative work of this development, with its mischievous child protagonist Arale Norimaki being among the first  manga to depict this type of archetypal character as a girl rather than a boy. The 1980s also saw female  manga artists rise to greater prominence: notably horror manga artist Kei Kusunoki, and Rumiko Takahashi with her romantic comedies Urusei Yatsura and Ranma ½.

Especially in  series that are aimed at an older audience, female characters are often presented in a manner that is attractive to the male target audience as so-called  (literally "beautiful young girls"). They exist as objects of romantic or sexual desire not merely for the male characters, but also for the ostensibly heterosexual male reader as a form of fan service. While these objectifying tropes have persisted in  manga, women have also developed more active roles in these fan service-oriented stories. A common romantic comedy trope in  manga since the 1980s has been to pair a weak male protagonist with a strong female love interest who is not only the target of his romantic and sexual desire, but also his good friend and confidante. In the harem genre, which originated from  manga, a male protagonist is surrounded by several female characters who desire him, and who are often more confident and assertive than he is; examples include Negima! Magister Negi Magi by Ken Akamatsu and Hanaukyo Maid Team by Morishige. In other cases, the male protagonist is unsuccessful in his attempts to woo the female character, or the story is focused around the originally naïve and infantile male protagonist maturing and learning how to develop healthy relationships with women.

Manga scholar Yukari Fujimoto notes in her analysis of the female readership of the  titles One Piece, Naruto, and The Prince of Tennis that homoerotic interpretations of  manga tend to be most common among titles that do not include prominent female characters that a female readership is able to identify with.

Magazines

At the industry's peak in the mid-1990s, there were 23 total  magazines, which collectively sold 662 million copies in 1995. The total manga magazine market that year included 265 magazines, with a total of 1.595 billion copies sold.

A manga magazine is typically several hundred pages long, and contains over a dozen series or one-shots. The largest Japanese  magazines in terms of circulation are Weekly Shōnen Jump by Shueisha, Weekly Shōnen Magazine by Kodansha, and Weekly Shōnen Sunday by Shogakukan; these publishers are also the largest publishers of manga generally. The fourth largest magazine, albeit by a significant margin, is Weekly Shōnen Champion by Akita Shoten, which was among the most popular manga magazines in the 1970s and 1980s. A list of the top  magazines by circulation as of 2015 are listed below:

References

Bibliography

 
Anime and manga terminology
Men in Japan
Men's entertainment
Boys